The Honourable Richard Watson (6 January 1800 – 24 July 1852) was a British Whig politician who served as a Member of Parliament (MP) for Canterbury from 1830 to 1835 and briefly in 1852 for Peterborough.

Watson was the fourth and youngest son of Lewis Thomas Watson, 2nd Baron Sondes (1794–1874), by his marriage to the heiress Mary Elizabeth Milles of North Elmham. His elder brother changed his name to Milles.

Watson was commissioned into the 11th Hussars, a cavalry regiment, and served in the Peninsula. He first stood for parliament at the 1826 general election in Canterbury, where he was nominated in his absence by the Reformers and polled just 107 votes. However, at the 1830 general election he topped the poll at Canterbury, with 1,334 votes, was returned unopposed in 1831, and again won a contested election in 1832, when one of the other candidates was the madman John Nichols Thom, calling himself Sir William Courtenay, otherwise 'Tom of Truro', who gained 375 votes. Watson was so dismayed by the support given to this opponent that he declined to stand again at the 1835 general election.

On 21 December 1839 Watson married Lavinia Jane, a daughter of Lord George Quin, granddaughter of Thomas Taylour, 1st Marquess of Headfort, and great-niece of George Spencer, 2nd Earl Spencer. They had three sons and two daughters, the last of whom was posthumous:
George Lewis Watson, married Laura Maria (d. 1893), daughter of Sir John Hobart Culme-Seymour, 2nd Baronet, in 1867, without issue
Edward Spencer Watson (d. January 1889), married Mary Blanche Hall on 28 September 1871 and had issue
Rev. Wentworth Watson (1 March 1848 – 5 July 1925), vicar of Monmouth, St. Thomas', Oxford, and Abingdon, married Eveleen Frances Stopford, sister of Albert Stopford, on 23 April 1903
Mary Georgiana Watson, married Sir Michael Culme-Seymour, 3rd Baronet on 16 October 1866
Lavinia Grace Watson (1852–1933), married Baron Eugen von Roeder (1847–1938) on 14 July 1875 and had issue

In 1849, he inherited from his childless brother Henry the remaining Northamptonshire estates of the family, centered on Rockingham Castle, where he had lived since 1836.

On 7 July 1852 he was returned at the general election to the Commons as MP for Peterborough, but died a few weeks later on 24 July 1852, at the age of 52, at the Baths in Bad Homburg, near Frankfurt. His body was brought home to England and buried at Rockingham, Northamptonshire.

References

External links 

1800 births
1852 deaths
Whig (British political party) MPs
Members of the Parliament of the United Kingdom for English constituencies
UK MPs 1830–1831
UK MPs 1831–1832
UK MPs 1832–1835
UK MPs 1852–1857
11th Hussars officers
Younger sons of barons